Tole Bi is a district of Turkistan Region in southern Kazakhstan. The administrative center of the district is the town of Lenger. Population:     The district is named after Töle Biy, who died there in the 18th century.

See also
Koksayek village

References

Districts of Kazakhstan
Turkistan Region